A midshipman fish is any species of toadfish belonging to the genus Porichthys (in family Batrachoididae). Midshipman fish are distinguished by their photophores (organs which attract prey and after which they are named, being said to resemble the buttons of a naval uniform) and four lateral lines. Typical midshipman fishes, such as the plainfin midshipman (Porichthys notatus), are nocturnal and bury themselves in sand or mud in the intertidal zone during the day. At night they float just above the seabed. Some species have venomous dorsal spines and are capable of inflicting serious injuries if handled.

Description 
Male midshipman fish have two morphs: type I and type II. Type I and type II males have different reproductive strategies, and can be distinguished from each other based on physical characteristics. Type I males are eight times larger in body mass, and have much larger vocal organs. Type II males’ reproductive organs are seven times larger in size than those of type I males. Female and type II male midshipman fish can be distinguished from each other by the female’s slightly larger size, and the type II male midshipman’s large reproductive organs.

Species

Extant species 
There are currently 14 recognized extant species in this genus:
 Porichthys analis C. L. Hubbs & L. P. Schultz, 1939 (Darkedge midshipman)
 Porichthys bathoiketes C. R. Gilbert, 1968
 Porichthys ephippiatus H. J. Walker & Rosenblatt, 1988 (Saddle midshipman)
 Porichthys greenei C. H. Gilbert & Starks, 1904 (Greene's midshipman)
 Porichthys kymosemeum C. R. Gilbert, 1968
 Porichthys margaritatus (J. Richardson, 1844) (Daisy midshipman)
 Porichthys mimeticus H. J. Walker & Rosenblatt, 1988 (Mimetic midshipman)
 Porichthys myriaster C. L. Hubbs & L. P. Schultz, 1939 (Specklefin midshipman)
 Porichthys notatus Girard, 1854 (Plainfin midshipman)
 Porichthys oculellus H. J. Walker & Rosenblatt, 1988 (Smalleye midshipman)
 Porichthys oculofrenum C. R. Gilbert, 1968
 Porichthys pauciradiatus D. K. Caldwell & M. C. Caldwell, 1963
 Porichthys plectrodon D. S. Jordan & C. H. Gilbert, 1882 (Atlantic midshipman)
 Porichthys porosissimus (G. Cuvier, 1829)

Fossil species 
 †Porichthys analis - Early Pliocene Onzole Formation, Ecuador
 †Porichthys margaritatus - idem
 †Porichthys pedemontanus  - Tortonian Italy

Biology

Reproduction and vocalization 

Mating in midshipman fishes depends on auditory communication. Male midshipman fish produce several different vocalizations while females only make grunts in non-breeding situations.

References

External links 
 

Batrachoididae
Bioluminescent fish
Extant Miocene first appearances